Luboš Tusjak (born 15 February 1992) is a Czech football player who currently plays for FK Viktoria Žižkov. He has represented the Czech Republic at under-17 level. He made his Czech First League debut for Slavia against Teplice on 22 August 2011.

References

External links
 
 

Czech footballers
Czech Republic youth international footballers
Czech Republic under-21 international footballers
1992 births
Living people
SK Slavia Prague players
FK Viktoria Žižkov players
FC Silon Táborsko players
MFK Karviná players
FC Sellier & Bellot Vlašim players
FK Slavoj Vyšehrad players
Czech National Football League players
Czech First League players
Association football defenders